The Congregational Church in India wants to be the continuation of the former Independent Church of Maraland. Under the leadership of Rev. Mark Lapi a sizeable group left the Evangelical Church of Maraland in 1989. The headquarters is in Serkawr.
The church has 5,500 members and 23 congregations as of 2004.
It is a member of the World Communion of Reformed Churches.

References

1989 establishments in India
Members of the World Communion of Reformed Churches
Congregationalism in India